Mike Custer was an American soccer forward who played professionally in the Major Indoor Soccer League and coached in the American Indoor Soccer Association.

Player

Youth
Custer graduated from Shawnee Mission North High School. He attended Ottawa University where he set the school’s season records for goals (28) and points (67). He is a member of the Ottawa University 1980-1989 All Decade Team and was named the Player of the Decade.

Professional
In 1979, Custer left Ottawa to attend an open tryout with the Wichita Wings of the Major Indoor Soccer League. Custer won a contract and spent two seasons with the Wings. In 1983, he played six games with the Memphis Americans.

Executive
From 1985 to January 1986, Custer served as operations director for the Dallas Sidekicks. On January 12, 1986, Custer became the head coach of the Milwaukee Wave of the National Professional Soccer League. The Wave fired him on January 18, 1987. Custer then became an executive with the Louisville Thunder.

Personal 
In July 1996, Custer was convicted of three counts of Indecency With a Child (by contact) in Dallas County, Texas. After his release from prison, he worked as the general manager for Goffs Hamburgers on Hillcrest Rd. until the time of his death.

References

External links
 MISL stats
 Wichita Wings: Mike Custer

1956 births
2008 deaths
American soccer coaches
American soccer players
American Indoor Soccer Association coaches
Memphis Americans players
Major Indoor Soccer League (1978–1992) players
Wichita Wings players
Association football forwards
Soccer players from Kansas
Sportspeople from Kansas City, Kansas
Ottawa Braves
Ottawa University alumni